Zero Down was an American punk rock trio formed by former Strung Out bassist Jim Cherry, former Down by Law drummer Milo Todesco and former War Called Peace guitarist John McCree. Frontman Cherry (who was also guitarist and songwriter for Epitaph Records band Pulley) enlisted the support of Fat Wreck Chords owner Fat Mike, who released the band's first (and only) album, With a Lifetime to Pay in 2001. The music was a throwback to mid-1990s melodic skate punk, and is still well received to this day. The band added a fourth member in August 2001, ex-Lagwagon guitarist Shawn Dewey.

Formation 
Zero Down started with Jim and a "Drummer Kid" as Jim says in an interview. While looking for a guitarist, Jim found guitarist John McCree through a mutual friend. They started jamming together, while the old drummer decided to leave. After attempts to find a new drummer, they ended up putting an ad in their local newspaper stating "punk band looking for a good drummer". Afterwards, Milo answered, and the three started jamming together. And after looking for a vocalist, Jim's wife Wendy Cherry, convinced him to sing himself, and keep the band as three-piece.

Recording & Touring 
Initially, the band was called Double Down when they started demoing for their album "With A Lifetime To Pay". They would later record with producer Ryan Greene and engineer Adam Krammer. During 2001, They would tour around the area, including doing shows for Sno Jam 7, along with doing shows with Diesel Boy and No Use for a Name. They were planning on recording another album sometime in mid-to-late 2001, though the album never came into fruition.

Jim's Death 
Zero Down came to a premature demise on July 7, 2002, with the death of Jim Cherry from a lifelong heart condition. Early reports suggested that Cherry died from an accidental prescription drug overdose; Fat Wreck Chords released the following statement:

 
However, in December 2002 the label released a further statement concerning Cherry's death:

Discography

Album
 With a Lifetime to Pay (2001), Fat Wreck Chords

Compilation contribution
 Fat Music Vol. V: Live Fat, Die Young (2001, Fat Wreck Chords with the song Down This Road)
 Wrecktrospective (2009, Fat Wreck Chords with a demo version of No Apologies, disc two)

References

External links
 Fat Wreck Chords
 Zero Down's page on Fat Wreck
 Zero Down's Myspace

Fat Wreck Chords artists
Punk rock groups from California